Friendsville Precinct is one of the eight precincts of Wabash County, Illinois. Although there is no incorporated town, there is a community, Friendsville, Illinois, in the precinct.

Precincts in Wabash County, Illinois